Ann S. Harnett ( Solowey, August 10, 1920 – 1974) was a female utility player who played from  through  in the All-American Girls Professional Baseball League. Listed at 5' 6", 139 lb., Harnett batted and threw right-handed. She was born in Chicago, Illinois.

Career
A Chicago baseball star and the first girl to sign a contract with the league, Harnett started her career at third base in 1943 with the Kenosha Comets, playing for them four years before joining the Peoria Redwings (1947). She started at third base during her first two seasons; in 1945 and 1946 played primarily as a catcher, and in 1947 moved to the outfield, though she pitched occasionally coming out of the bullpen. Her most productive season came in 1943, when she led the league in extra base hits (26), drove in 69 runs, and collected the best fielding average (.891) among defenders at third base, while hitting a solid .271 average. In the inaugural season, she also became the first third basewoman ever selected to an AAGPBL All-Star Team. But her average dropped off after the first season to .248 (1944), .202 (1945), .224 (1946) and .203 (1947). Following her baseball career, Harnett became a nun.

Career statistics
Batting

Fielding

References

External links
Feldman, Jay (June 10, 1985). "All But Forgotten Now, A Women's Baseball League Once Flourished". Sports Illustrated. Retrieved April 14, 2019.
de la Cretaz, Britni (May 10, 2018). Honoring' Female Baseball Players With the Lipstick They Were Required to Wear". Racked. Retrieved April 14, 2019.

1920 births
2006 deaths
20th-century American people
20th-century American women
All-American Girls Professional Baseball League players
Kenosha Comets players
Peoria Redwings players
Baseball players from Chicago
Sportspeople from Massachusetts
21st-century American women